Beatrice Regina della Scala (1331 – 18 June 1384) was Lady of Milan by marriage to Bernabò Visconti, Lord of Milan, and politically active as the adviser of her spouse.

Life 
Beatrice Regina was born in Verona in 1331, the youngest child and only daughter of Mastino II della Scala and Taddea da Carrara. She had three older brothers, and five illegitimate half-siblings. Her father, who was a member of the Scaliger family of Northern Italy, was Lord of Verona, Vicenza, Brescia, Parma, and Lucca. Her paternal grandparents were Alboino I della Scala and Beatrice, daughter of Gilberto III da Correggio of Parma, and her maternal grandparents were Jacopo I da Carrara and Anna Gradenigo, daughter of Pietro Gradenigo, Doge of Venice and Tommasina Morosini.

Lady of Milan 
On 27 September 1350 in Verona, Beatrice Regina was married to Bernabò Visconti, son of Stefano Visconti and Valentina Doria. She was nineteen years of age and he was twenty-seven. The marriage welded a powerful political alliance between Milan and Verona. He assumed power as Lord of Milan in 1354, henceforth, Beatrice Regina was styled as Lady of Milan. 

It has been claimed that Bernabò was a cruel and ruthless despot, and an implacable enemy of the Church. He seized the papal city of Bologna, rejected the Pope and his authority, confiscated ecclesiastical property, and forbade any of his subjects to have any dealings with the Curia. He was excommunicated as a heretic in 1363 by Pope Urban V, who preached crusade against him. When Bernabò was in one of his frequent rages, only Beatrice Regina was able to approach him. She reportedly had a strong will, and her influence upon Bernabò - and thereby upon the policy of Milan - was recognized: Catherine of Siena used her as an intermediary every time she had a political request to Bernabò. 

Beatrice Regina died on 18 June 1384 at the age of fifty-three years. She was buried in Milan. A year and a half later, her husband was deposed and later poisoned by his nephew and son-in-law Gian Galeazzo Visconti, who in 1395 became the first Duke of Milan.

Legacy
She gave her name to the church of Santa Maria alla Scala in Milan, and by extension, the La Scala opera house (Teatro alla Scala) which was built on the same site four hundred years later.

Issue
Together Bernabò and Beatrice Regina had at least between 15 and 17 documented children:

 Taddea Visconti (1351 – 28 September 1381), married on 13 October 1364 Stephen III, Duke of Bavaria, by whom she had three children including Isabeau of Bavaria, Queen consort of King Charles VI of France
 Verde Visconti (1352 – bef. 11 March 1414), married on 23 February 1365 Leopold III, Duke of Inner Austria, by whom she had six children.
 Marco Visconti (November 1353 – 3 January 1382), Lord of Parma in 1364; married in 1367  Elisabeth of Bavaria, by whom he had one daughter.
 Antonia Visconti (ca. 1354 – 26 March 1405), engaged in 1366 to King Frederick III of Sicily, but he died before the wedding took place; married 27 October 1380 Eberhard III, Count of Wurttemberg, by whom she had three sons.
 Valentina Visconti (ca. 1357 – bef. September 1393), married in September 1378 King Peter II of Cyprus, by whom she had one daughter who died in early infancy.
 Lodovico Visconti (1358 – 7 March 1404), Governor and Lord of Parma during 1364–1404 and Governor of Lodi during 1379–1385; married in November 1381 Violante Visconti, widow of Lionel of Antwerp and Secondotto, Marquess of Montferrat. They had a son, Giovanni, who possibly left descendants: the family Milano-Visconti, Reichsfreiherren at Utrecht claim descent from him. 
 Carlo Visconti (September 1359 – August 1403), Lord Cremona, Borgo San Donnino and Parma in 1379; married Beatrice of Armagnac, daughter of John II, Count of Armagnac and Jeanne de Périgord, by whom he had four children.
 Caterina Visconti (1361 – 17 October 1404), married on 2 October 1380 as his second wife, Gian Galeazzo Visconti 1st Duke of Milan, by whom she had two sons, Gian Maria Visconti, 2nd Duke of Milan; and Filippo Maria Visconti, 3rd Duke of Milan, who fathered Bianca Maria Visconti by his mistress Agnese del Maino.
 Agnese Visconti (1362 – 7 February 1391), married 26 September 1380 Francesco I Gonzaga, by whom she had one daughter. Agnes was executed for alleged adultery.
 Rodolfo Visconti (ca. 1364 – January 1389), Lord of Bergamo, Soncino and Ghiara d'Adda in 1379. Unmarried.
 Maddalena Visconti (ca. 1366 – 17 July 1404), married 9 April 1382 Frederick, Duke of Bavaria, by whom she had five children including Henry XVI of Bavaria.
 Anglesia Visconti (ca. 1368 – 12 October 1439), married in January 1400 King Janus of Cyprus, but the union was childless and was dissolved 1407/1409; he married in 1411 as his second wife, Charlotte de Bourbon-La Marche by whom he had six children.
 Mastino Visconti (March 1371 – 19 June 1405), Lord of Bergamo, Valcamonica and Ghiaradadda in 1405; married in 1385 to Cleofa della Scala, by whom he had three children.
 Elisabetta Visconti (1374 – 2 February 1432), married on 26 January 1395 Ernest, Duke of Bavaria, by whom she had five children including Albert III, Duke of Bavaria.
 Lucia Visconti (ca. 1380 – 14 April 1424), married firstly on 28 June 1399 Frederick of Thuringia (future Elector of Saxony) but the union was dissolved on grounds of non-consummation shortly after; married secondly on 24 January 1407 Edmund Holland, 4th Earl of Kent. No issue.

Ancestry

References

 Charles Cawley, Medieval Lands, Lords of Milan
 Barbara W. Tuchman, A Distant Mirror, Alfred A. Knopf Inc., New York, 1978

1331 births
1384 deaths
Beatrice
People from Verona
14th-century Italian women
Beatrice